Ron Clinkscale (born October 22, 1933) is a former American football quarterback who played four seasons in the Canadian Football League with the BC Lions and Calgary Stampeders. He played college football at Texas Christian University.

External links
Just Sports Stats
TCU Horned Frogs Hall of Fame
Fanbase profile

Living people
1933 births
Players of American football from Texas
American football quarterbacks
Canadian football quarterbacks
American players of Canadian football
TCU Horned Frogs football players
BC Lions players
Calgary Stampeders players
Sportspeople from Amarillo, Texas